Skibbereen is a town in County Cork, Ireland. It is located in West Cork on the N71 national secondary road. The River Ilen runs through the town; it reaches the sea about 12 kilometres away, at the seaside village of Baltimore. As of the 2011 Irish census, the population of the town (not including the rural hinterland) was 2,568. The town of Skibbereen, sometimes shortened to "Skibb", is in the Cork South-West Dáil constituency, which has three seats.

Geography
Skibbereen is located on the River Ilen in West Cork. In his book The Origin and History of Irish Names of Places (1869), the historian Patrick Weston Joyce suggests that the Irish place name Sciobairín or Scibirín derives from the small boats or skiffs (scibs) that were common on this stretch of the river.

History
Prior to 1600, most of the land in the area belonged to the native MacCarthy Reagh dynasty. The town charter dates back to 1657 and a copy can be seen in the town council chambers. In 1631, Skibbereen received an influx of refugees fleeing from the Sack of Baltimore. The "Phoenix Society" was founded in Skibbereen in 1856 and was a precursor to the Fenian movement.

A statue, the 'Maid of Erin' erected in 1904, sits on top of a memorial to commemorate four failed uprisings against British rule, the dates of which are engraved on each side of the plinth: 1798, 1803, 1848, 1867.

Skibbereen was once a stop on the West Cork Railway, which scheduled trains from West Cork to Cork City. The construction of the railways took place between 1851 and 1893 and by 1961, all West Cork railway lines were closed. The original railway bridge is still visible by the West Cork Hotel..  Skibbereen also had a separate terminus station on the narrow-gauge Schull and Skibbereen Tramway and Light Railway.

Famine

The region around Skibbereen experienced a significant famine in the years 1845–52, a time referred to as The Great Hunger or Great Famine (Irish: an Gorta Mór). The Skibbereen Heritage Centre estimates that 8,000 to 10,000 victims of the Famine are buried in the famine burial pits of Abbeystrewery cemetery close to the town. While there is some question on the accuracy of census data from the famine era, records indicate a drop of population from 58,335 in 1841 to 32,412 in 1861.

Skibbereen is also the name of a song about the Famine, and the impact it and the British Government had on the people of Ireland. The song, known as Dear Old Skibbereen, takes the form of a conversation between a father and a son, in which the son asks his father why he fled the land he loved so well.

A permanent exhibition to commemorate the memory of the victims of the Great Famine is sited at the Skibbereen Heritage Centre. Skibbereen was also the focal point of Ireland's first National Famine Memorial Day on 17 May 2009. The town was selected as it was in one of the areas worst affected by the Great Famine. The National Famine Commemoration Committee agreed that the centrepiece of the memorial day would rotate between the Four Provinces on an annual basis.

Media

The Skibbereen Eagle, a newspaper founded in 1857, published both local and international stories. For example, it published an editorial that "told Lord Palmerston that it had 'got its eye both upon him and on the Emperor of Russia'." And a 1914 article said "We give this solemn warning to Kaiser Wilhelm: The Skibbereen Eagle has its eye on you." This newspaper was superseded by the Southern Star, which was founded in Skibbereen in 1889.

Sport
O'Donovan Rossa GAA is the local Gaelic Athletic Association club. The local secondary school St. Fachtna's was a finalist in 1982 and a winner in 1991 of the Hogan Cup for Gaelic football.

Skibbereen Rowing Club is situated on the outskirts of the town, and is one of the most successful clubs in Ireland. Club members Paul and Gary O'Donovan won silver at the 2016 summer Olympics in the men's lightweight double sculls, the first Olympic medal won by Irish rowers. Paul O'Donovan and fellow club member Fintan McCarthy subsequently won gold at the 2020 Olympics in Tokyo.

A.F.C.Skibbereen is the local association football (soccer) club, with other sports clubs including Skibbereen Golf Club, Skibbereen Rugby Club, and Skibbereen Athletics Club.

Education
There are four primary schools located in the town, including Abbeystrewry National School (a mixed school), Gaelscoil Dr O'Suilleabhain (a mixed Irish-speaking school), St. Patrick's Primary School (boys), and Scoil Naomh Seosamh (girls)

Until 2016, there were three secondary schools: Rossa College (mixed sex), St Fachtna's De la Salle (boys), and Mercy Heights (girls). The three schools merged into one school called Skibbereen Community School which opened in September 2016.

Demographics
As of the 2016 census, in terms of ethnicity, the Skibbereen Urban and Skibbereen Rural electoral divisions were 75.6% white Irish, 18.8% other white ethnicities, 0.6% black, 1.2% Asian, 1% of other ethnicity, and 2.9% with no stated ethnicity. As of 2016, 5.4% of Skibbereen's urban population identified with a UK nationality, compared to an average of 2.6% for the county as a whole.

In terms of religion, the 2011 census returns recorded the population as being 79% Catholic, 11.5% other stated religion, 7% with no religion, and 1.5% not stated.

Notable people
Marian Barry, trade unionist
Agnes Mary Clerke, astronomer and writer born in Skibbereen
Ambrose Coghill, actor and aristocrat
Bob Crowley, theatre designer who keeps a home in Skibbereen
Seamus Davis, physicist and member of the U.S. National Academy of Sciences grew up in Skibbereen
Tony Davis, former Gaelic footballer and television analyst for RTÉ's The Sunday Game programme
Edward Galloway (1840-1861) first soldier in the American Civil War to be mortally wounded; His brother was Major Andrew Power Gallwey mortally wounded at Port Hudson and died in Baton Rouge on 9 July 1863.
Canon James Goodman, clergyman and collector of Irish folk music
Jeremy Irons, English actor who maintains a fishing cottage in Skibbereen
Percy Ludgate, designer of an analytical engine, born in Skibbereen
Fintan McCarthy, Olympic gold medallist (rowing – lightweight double sculls, 2020)
Kieron Moore, actor
Gary O'Donovan, Olympic silver medallist (rowing – lightweight double sculls, 2016)
Paul O'Donovan, Olympic gold medallist (rowing – lightweight double sculls, 2020)
Jeremiah O'Donovan Rossa, Fenian leader who worked in Skibbereen
David Puttnam, English film producer
Jasper Wolfe, Teachta Dála and solicitor
Don Wycherley, actor

Culture and leisure

Arts Festival 
The Skibbereen Arts Festival occurs annually, taking place at the end of July and including community-based projects as well as a mix of national and international films, theatre, visual art and music acts.

Agricultural Festival 
The Carbery Show takes place on the third Thursday of July each year. The show includes agricultural, horticultural, livestock, craft, bakery and other competitions, as well as a pet show, and trade exhibition. The first Carbery Show took place in 1836.

Music 
A number of different music events are held each year, with several bars and venues in town (including "Baby Hannah's") hosting musical acts. Skibbereen has also hosted the Cork X Southwest Music & Arts Festival over several years. The 2011 festival was held at Liss Ard Estate and featured Patti Smith, Echo & the Bunnymen, Balkan Beat Box, Fred and others across a two-day lineup.

Beaches 
Just outside Skibbereen is Tragumna beach, and the town's location near the coast means that sea fishing, scuba diving, sailing, and kayaking are possible locally.

See also
List of towns and villages in Ireland

References

External links

Official Website
Skibbereen Heritage Centre

 
Towns and villages in County Cork